Martina Fidanza (born 5 November 1999) is an Italian professional racing cyclist, who currently rides for UCI Women's Continental Team CERATIZIT-WNT Pro Cycling. She is, respectively, the daughter and sister of racing cyclists Giovanni Fidanza and Arianna Fidanza.

Major results

Road

2017
 2nd Road race, National Junior Championships
 3rd Piccolo Trofeo Alfredo Binda
2018
 9th Trofee Maarten Wynants

Track

2016
 1st  Team sprint, National Junior Championships
 2nd Team sprint, UCI World Junior Championships
 3rd Keirin, Jihomoravsky Kraj
2017
 UCI World Junior Championships
1st  Scratch
1st  Team pursuit
 UEC European Junior Championships
1st  Team pursuit
1st  Scratch
2nd  Keirin
 2nd Scratch, National Junior Championships
2018
 1st  Keirin, National Championships
 2nd  Team pursuit, UEC European Under-23 Championships
2019
 UCI World Cup
1st  Scratch, Hong Kong
2nd  Scratch, Minsk
 National Track Championships
1st  Keirin
3rd Sprint
 2nd  Scratch, European Games
2020
 UEC European Under-23 Championships
1st  Team pursuit
1st  Scratch
1st  Madison
 1st  Scratch, UEC European Track Championships
2021
 UCI World Championships
1st  Scratch
2nd  Team pursuit
 UEC European Under-23 Championships
1st  Team pursuit
1st  Madison (with Chiara Consonni)
3rd  Scratch
 1st  Madison (with Rachele Barbieri), National Championships
 2nd  Team pursuit, UEC European Championships
2022
 UCI World Championships
1st  Team pursuit
1st  Scratch
 2nd  Team pursuit, UEC European Championships

References

External links
 
 
 

1999 births
Living people
Italian female cyclists
Cyclists from the Province of Bergamo
Cyclists at the 2019 European Games
European Games medalists in cycling
European Games silver medalists for Italy
UCI Track Cycling World Champions (women)
People from Ponte San Pietro
Italian track cyclists
21st-century Italian women